Malwasthan is a geographical region situated in the districts of Ludhiana, Ropad, Fatehgarh Sahib, Mansa, Bathinda, Moga, Faridkot, Muktsar, and Fazilka in the state of Punjab, India.

References 

Landforms of Punjab, India